Byron Burk Gentry (October 20, 1913February 10, 1992) was a professional American football guard in the National Football League. He played three seasons for the Pittsburgh Pirates.

Gentry played college football at the University of Southern California where he was also a member of Phi Kappa Tau fraternity.  At USC, he played on the 1931 and 1932 Rose Bowl championship teams.  He was a decorated soldier, rising to the rank of Capitan, and serving as an intelligence officer in World War II.  He later was a state and national commander of the Veterans of Foreign Wars. Gentry's post-football career was in the law and he was city attorney of Pasadena, California for sixteen years. He was also a published writer and poet.

References

External links 
 

1913 births
1992 deaths
Players of American football from Washington (state)
American football offensive guards
Pittsburgh Pirates (football) players
University of Southern California alumni
USC Trojans football players